Mikel Bizkarra Etxegibel (born 21 August 1989) is a Spanish cyclist, who currently rides for UCI ProTeam . In August 2018, he was named in the startlist for the Vuelta a España.

Major results

2011
 10th Overall Ronde de l'Isard
2013
 7th Vuelta a la Comunidad de Madrid
 10th Overall Tour of China I
2016
 5th Overall Vuelta a Asturias
 6th Overall Troféu Joaquim Agostinho
 7th Overall Route du Sud
2017
 4th Overall Tour du Gévaudan Languedoc-Roussillon
 10th Boucles de l'Aulne
2018
 3rd Overall Vuelta a Aragón
1st  Mountains classification
1st Stage 3
2019
 4th Giro dell'Appennino
2021
 9th Overall Vuelta a Andalucía
 10th Overall Route d'Occitanie
2022
 4th Overall Vuelta a Asturias

Grand Tour general classification results timeline

References

External links

1989 births
Living people
Spanish male cyclists
Cyclists from the Basque Country (autonomous community)
People from Durangaldea
Sportspeople from Biscay